Garryspillane GAA club is a Gaelic Athletic Association club located in the parish of Knocklong/Glenbrohane, County Limerick, Ireland. The club was founded in 1952 and is almost exclusively concerned with hurling with footballers catered for by neighbouring Galbally.

Location
The club is located in the parish of Knocklong/Glenbrohane in south east County Limerick on the border with County Tipperary. The parish is situated 35 km south of Limerick City between the Galtee and Ballyhoura Mountains. The neighbouring clubs are Galbally, with whom Garryspillane members play Gaelic Football, Ballylanders, Glenroe, Blackrock, Staker Wallace, Knockainey, Hospital Herbertstown and Emly in Tipperary. The club is a member of the south division of Limerick GAA.

Notable Hurlers
 T.J Ryan-played intercounty hurling for Limerick and captained the side on 2 different occasions in 2004 and 2006,
 Donie Ryan-Played intercounty hurling for Limerick,
 Frankie Carroll-Played intercounty hurling for Limerick,
 Mossie Carroll-Played intercounty hurling for Limerick,
 Brian Carroll-Played intercounty hurling for Limerick,
 Micheal O'Donnell-Played intercounty hurling for Limerick,
 Ray Sampson-Played intercounty hurling for Limerick,
 Andy Garvey-Played intercounty hurling for Limerick,
 Brian Stapleton-Played intercounty hurling for Limerick,
 Eoin Stapleton-Played intercounty hurling for Limerick,
 John Kiely-Played intercounty hurling for Limerick and manager of Senior Hurling team
 Maurice O'Brien-Played intercounty hurling for Limerick and is currently playing for Dublin at senior level,
 James Ryan-Currently playing intercounty hurling for Limerick

Honours
 All Ireland Sevens (1): 2003
 Limerick Senior Hurling Championship (1): 2005
 Limerick Premier Intermediate Hurling Championship (1): 2018
 Limerick Under-21 County Hurling Championship (3): 1969, 1995, 2003 
 Limerick Senior All County League (2) 2001, 2002
 Limerick Intermediate Hurling Championship (2) 1990, 1996
 Limerick Junior Hurling Championship (4) 1960, 1970, 1978, 1984
 Limerick Senior All County Hurling League (2) 2001, 2002
 Limerick Junior Football Championship (3) 1976, 1980, 1993
 Limerick Minor Football Championship (1) 1994
  Limerick Premier Minor Hurling Championship (2) 2017, 2018
 Limerick Premier Under-16 Hurling Championship (1) 2016
 Limerick Under-16 Football Championship (2) 1998, 2000
 Limerick Under-16 Hurling Championship (2) 2003, 2015
 Limerick Premier Under-15 Hurling Championship (1) 2015
 Limerick Under-14 Hurling Championship (4) 1986, 2010, 2014, 2015
 All Ireland Feile Division 2 Shield (1) 2015
 Limerick Under-14 Féile 'B' Hurling Championship (1) 2011, 2015
 Limerick Under-14 Football Championship (2)  1996, 2001
 Limerick Under-13 Hurling Championship (3) 2011, 2013, 2014

External links
Garryspillane GAA site

Gaelic games clubs in County Limerick
Hurling clubs in County Limerick